Ronald S. Rector (May 29, 1944 – July 14, 1968)  was an American football running back in the National Football League (NFL) for the Green Bay Packers, the Washington Redskins, and the Atlanta Falcons.  He played college football at Northwestern University and was drafted in the ninth round of the 1966 NFL Draft.

On June 29, 1968, Rector suffered a fractured skull and a concussion as a result of a motorcycle accident on Interstate 71 and died on July 14, 1968 as a result of these injuries.

References

1944 births
1968 deaths
American football running backs
Atlanta Falcons players
Green Bay Packers players
Motorcycle road incident deaths
Northwestern Wildcats football players
Players of American football from Akron, Ohio
Washington Redskins players
Road incident deaths in Ohio